Eupselia holoxantha is a species of moth of the family Depressariidae. It is found in Australia, where it has been recorded from Queensland, New South Wales, the Australian Capital Territory and South Australia.

The wingspan is about 20 mm. The basal third of the forewings is cream, while the marginal two thirds are dark brown. The hindwings are yellow.

The larvae are thought to feed on the foliage of Eucalyptus species.

References

External links
Taxonomy

Moths described in 1894
Eupselia
Moths of Australia